Bernard Leslie Shannon (12 February 1929 – 19 February 2014) was an Australian rules footballer who played for the Collingwood Football Club in the Victorian Football League (VFL).

Notes

External links 

Bernie Shannon's playing statistics from The VFA Project
Bernie Shannon's profile at Collingwood Forever

1929 births
2014 deaths
Australian rules footballers from Victoria (Australia)
Collingwood Football Club players
Port Melbourne Football Club players